Camp Dearborn is a park in Milford Township, Michigan owned by the city of Dearborn, Michigan. The  park has several ponds and lakes as well as access to the Huron River, a half-mile swimming beach, swimming pool, picnic sites, and camping areas. Activities include fishing, paddle boat rentals, hayrides, dances, miniature golf and a 27-hole golf course. Canoe/kayaks can launch into the Huron River while a bike trail connects to downtown and other local parks. Camping is available for tents and RVs on 191 sites (including a section for permanent trailers) and in 118 permanent tents and 30 cabins. 

Camp Dearborn opened on May 29, 1948 under leadership of Mayor Orville L. Hubbard. Services in the park are provided by Dearborn city employees.
During the Great Recession of 2008, Dearborn investigated selling off the camp but found that the camp was profitable and that there was no prospect of a reasonably profitable sale due to zoning issues.

References
Dearborn Then and Now - Camp Dearborn, Dearborn Historical Museum, video segment, 2009 

Protected areas of Oakland County, Michigan
Huron River (Michigan)
Dearborn, Michigan
Parks in Michigan
Protected areas established in 1948
1948 establishments in Michigan